Juozas Gruodis (20 December 1884 in Rokėnai, Russian Empire – 16 April 1948 in Kaunas, Lithuanian SSR, Soviet Union) was a famous Lithuanian classic, composer, educator and professor.

Biography 
His father was a woodworker who also made musical instruments.

External links 
 The Memorial museum of J. Gruodis   
 Short biography of Juozas Gruodis   
 Short biography

1884 births
1948 deaths
Musicians from Kaunas
Recipients of the Order of the Red Banner of Labour
Lithuanian composers
Burials at Petrašiūnai Cemetery